A Critical Introduction to Phonetics is a 2009 book by Ken Lodge designed for an introductory course in phonetics.

Reception 
The book was reviewed by Linda Shockey, Camilo Enrique Díaz Romero and Morteza Taheri.

References

External links 
A Critical Introduction to Phonetics

2009 non-fiction books
Phonetics books
Linguistics textbooks
Continuum International Publishing Group books